Georg Holzmann (born 5 March 1961) is a German former ice hockey player. He competed in the men's tournaments at the 1988 Winter Olympics and the 1992 Winter Olympics.

References

External links
 

1961 births
Living people
Olympic ice hockey players of West Germany
Olympic ice hockey players of Germany
Ice hockey players at the 1988 Winter Olympics
Ice hockey players at the 1992 Winter Olympics
Sportspeople from Füssen
Adler Mannheim players